The 2005 Polish Film Awards ran on March 5, 2005. It was the 7th edition of Polish Film Awards: Eagles.

Awards nominees and winners
Winners are highlighted in boldface.

Best Film
 The Wedding - Wojciech Smarzowski
 Mój Nikifor - Juliusz Machulski
 Pręgi - Wlodzimierz Otulak, Krzysztof Zanussi, Iwona Ziulkowska

Best Actor
 The Wedding - Marian Dziedziel
 Pręgi - Michał Żebrowski
 Ubu król - Jan Peszek

Best Actress
 Mój Nikifor - Krystyna Feldman
 Pręgi - Agnieszka Grochowska
 Ubu król - Katarzyna Figura

Supporting Actor
 Pręgi - Jan Frycz
 Symetria - Borys Szyc
 The Wedding - Arkadiusz Jakubik
 Zerwany - Krzysztof Globisz

Supporting Actress
 The Wedding - Iwona Bielska
 Pręgi - Dorota Kaminska
 Symetria - Kinga Preis

Film Score
 The Wedding - Tymon Tymański
 Mój Nikifor - Bartlomiej Gliniak
 Ono - Pawel Mykietyn
 Pręgi - Adrian Konarski

Director
 The Wedding - Wojciech Smarzowski
 Mój Nikifor - Krzysztof Krauze
 Vinci - Juliusz Machulski

Screenplay
 The Wedding - Wojciech Smarzowski
 Mój Nikifor - Krzysztof Krauze, Joanna Kos
 Pręgi - Wojciech Kuczok
 Vinci - Juliusz Machulski

Cinematography
 Mój Nikifor - Krzysztof Ptak
 Pręgi - Marcin Koszalka
 Symetria - Arkadiusz Tomiak

Costume Design
 Ubu król - Magdalena Biedrzycka
 Mój Nikifor - Dorota Roqueplo
 The Wedding - Magdalena Maciejewska

Sound
 Mój Nikifor - Nikodem Wolk-Laniewski
 Nigdy w zyciu! - Marek Wronko
 Pręgi - Michal Zarnecki

Editing
 Mój Nikifor - Krzysztof Szpetmanski
 Ubu król - Elzbieta Kurkowska
 The Wedding - Pawel Laskowski

Production Design
 Mój Nikifor - Magdalena Dipont
 Pręgi - Joanna Doroszkiewicz, Ewa Skoczkowska
 The Wedding - Barbara Ostapowicz

European Film
 Girl with a Pearl Earring - Peter Webber (United Kingdom/Luxembourg)
 Bad Education - Pedro Almodóvar (Spain)
 The Return - Andrei Zvyagintsev (Russia)

Special awards
 Audience Award: The Wedding
 Life Achievement Award: Jerzy Kawalerowicz

External links
 2005 Polish Film Awards at IMDb

Polish Film Awards ceremonies
Polish Film Awards
Polish Film Awards, 2005